The C&O desk is one of six desks ever used in the Oval Office by a sitting President of the United States. The C&O Desk was used there only by George H. W. Bush, one of two Oval Office desks (along with the Johnson desk) to be used by only one president. Prior to its use in the Oval Office by Bush, the desk had been used elsewhere in the White House. It is the shortest-served Oval Office desk to date, having been used for only one four-year term.

Built around 1920, the C&O desk is one of four desks built for the owners of the Chesapeake and Ohio Railway (C&O). It was later donated to the White House by Chesapeake and Ohio's successor, CSX Transportation.

Design and markings
The C&O desk, constructed around 1920, is a walnut reproduction of an eighteenth-century Chippendale double pedestal desk (also known as a partners desk). The desk features an inverted breakfront form and each of the two pedestals is veneered  with burlwood and contains three graduated drawers on each of the two faces. The narrow desktop consists of a narrow frieze tier of drawers recessed back from the rest of the furniture piece, and the whole desk sits on bracket feet. The top of the desk is inlaid with burled maple.

History

Van Sweringen brothers' Terminal Tower offices

In 1930, the Van Sweringen brothers, Oris Paxton (O.P.) Van Sweringen and Mantis James (M.J.) Van Sweringen, completed construction of Terminal Tower, a 52-story, 708-foot tall skyscraper built over Union Terminal  in Cleveland, Ohio. The tower, built at virtually the same time as the Chrysler Building and the Empire State Building was designed in a much more conservative, Beaux-Arts style than other towers of the time period. It took a decade to complete. This conservative styling extended to the interiors of the building with the Van Sweringen brothers constructing lavish offices on the 36th floor of the building in an old-world English style. Featuring suites paneled in oak imported from Sherwood Forest the rooms were filled with furniture pieces designed and built in a variety of historic English styles by Rorimer-Brooks. Louis Rorimer, the sole head of Rorimer-Brooks, was a Cleveland based interior designer known for his knowledge of art and architectural history. Designer James Irving states "I consider Louis Rorimer to be the Louis Comfort Tiffany of furniture." Rorimer-Brooks' records were destroyed in 1957 by Irving and Co. who had acquired the company. Rorimer-Brooks designed and built matching walnut partners desks for the offices on the 36th floor of Terminal Tower, the Van Sweringen's executive offices. Four matching desks were made for this floor of the tower, one for each office, around 1920. The four offices, and the four matching desks, originally were used by O.P. Van Sweringen, M.J. Van Sweringen, C. L. Bradley, and D. S. Barret Jr.

A "Walnut and Burl Table Desk" designed by Rorimer-Brooks' chief designer William B. Green, was on display at the Cleveland Museum of Art's May Show in 1923. This desk won first prize in the furniture category. Unfortunately on the entry card it clearly states that no reproduction images were allowed to be taken of the desk so while the description of the desk on display matches the four desks created for the Van Sweringen's executive offices, it may be impossible to definitively state this award winning desk is the same designs as the C&O desk.

The Van Sweringen brothers built a vast and maze-like empire of real estate and railroad holdings, including the Chesapeake and Ohio Railway (C&O), out of this office and on these desks. This all came crashing down with the onset of the Great Depression. The Van Sweringen empire collapsed in May 1935 when they had to use all of their cash and equity to pay off creditors. Both of the brothers died shortly after with M.J. dying on December 12, 1935, and O.P. dying less than a year later on November 23, 1936. After the deaths of the brothers the C&O offices remained in Terminal Tower. The desks remained in the four rooms and were used by C&O Chairman Cyrus Eaton, the railroad president, the president's key associate, and one was set aside for visiting dignitaries.

Diplomatic Reception Rooms

During the 1950s the new headquarters of the United States Department of State were planned and constructed at what is now called the Harry S Truman Building. Clement Conger, then an Assistant Chief of Protocol, recommended that a large area of the building be set aside for Diplomatic Reception Rooms as hotels and clubs had to be used for entertaining and receptions by the Vice President and Cabinet members as they could not use the spaces in the White House. Funds were appropriated by congress to build these sixteen rooms but no funds were set aside for furnishings or interior decoration. Opening with their first official event in January 1961, the rooms "looked like a 1950s motel: exterior walls made of floor-to-ceiling plate glass with exposed steel beams, openings without doors, support beams encased in fire-proofing material set out three feet from the walls, wall-to-wall carpeting on concrete floors, and acoustical-tile ceilings throughout" according to Conger. After Conger gave a tour of the space to Mary Caroline Pratt Herter, wife of then-Secretary of State Christian Herter, who was hosting the first event in the rooms, Mrs. Herter began to cry due to the quality of the rooms. Conger explained that after this interaction he "volunteered to run a public campaign to furnish the rooms in a manner befitting America's heritage." Conger founded the Office of Fine Arts in the State Department and after their first meeting on March 22, 1961, began acquiring furniture and objects to decorate the Diplomatic Rooms purely through donations. The only government funds were spent on salaries and office expenses.

Because no federal funds were used to decorate the spaces Conger was creative in how he acquired pieces for the collection. Conger explains, "Early on, I learned that collectors overcollect and that the Diplomatic Reception Rooms are attractive homes for a family's superabundance of objects.  One of my best methods for acquiring needed pieces has been to ask for them on loan. Once people see such pieces in place, they want to demonstrate their commitment to the nation and to international diplomacy by donating their possessions or by making a purchase possible at a reasonable price." One of the objects collected in this manner was what we now call the C&O desk. A document listing objects loaned to the White House between 1969 and 1974 lists that the desk was loaned to the Diplomatic Reception Rooms some time before this by Hays T. Watkins of the Chessie System.(The Chessie System was the name for the new railroad conglomerate formed when the C&O acquired the Baltimore and Ohio in 1963.) Watkins recalled Conger's attempt to get the desk in his memoir, Just call me Hays. Watkins recalls, "...Clement Conger, curator of the White House at the time, was in Cleveland and saw our offices. He spotted my desk and said, "I've been looking for a desk for the President's private study just like that. Would you give it to us?" I said, "No." Then he asked if we would sell it to them? Again, I declined. "Well," he said, " would you loan it to us so we could use it for a while?" I said, "For how long?" He said, "Indefinitely." After talking with the board, we agreed."

The desk was subsequently loaned to the White House at some point between 1969 and 1974.

White House

In March 1975 Conger, who had by then become the White House Curator, placed the C&O desk in the Oval Office Study. He wrote a memo to Gerald Ford noting the new historic items recently placed in the room including the desk, which was still on loan. Presidents Gerald Ford, Jimmy Carter, and Ronald Reagan all used the desk in this room just next to the Oval Office.

After a series of mergers, the newly-named Chessie System merged with Seaboard Coast Line Industries on November 1, 1980, to form the new CSX Corporation. CSX kept the Van Sweringen brothers' offices in Terminal Tower until finally vacating them in 1986. In 1987, during the presidency of Ronald Reagan, the C&O desk was donated by the CSX Corporation to the White House.

On May 2, 1985, the desk was moved from the Oval Office study to  then Vice President George H. W. Bush's main work space in the White House where he started using it. When Marlin Fitzwater, White House Press Secretary under both presidents Ronald Reagan and George H. W. Bush, was asked about Bush's use of the C&O desk, he stated that "... he got used to it, found it comfortable, [and] thought it was attractive".

After his presidential inauguration on January 20, 1989, the C&O desk was used in the residential portion of the White House, and on June 13, 1989, it was moved into the newly decorated Oval Office. The Resolute desk, the Oval Office desk removed for the C&O, was placed briefly in the White House storage room, but found a final resting place for the Bush White House in the Treaty Room which Bush used as an ancillary office.

Doro Bush Koch, one of George Bush's children, wrote that Bush chose to use the C&O desk due to a perceived tradition. Lyndon B. Johnson chose not to use the Resolute desk after Kennedy's assassination and instead moved the desk he used as vice president to the Oval Office. Koch claims that Richard Nixon and Gerald Ford also brought their vice-presidential desks to the Oval Office, Jimmy Carter used the Resolute desk because he was never a vice president, and Bush brought his vice-presidential desk as a way to continue this perceived tradition.

On the desk Bush kept a pencil holder with a small American flag. This flag was given to him in 1989 by a nineteen year-old Army Ranger at a San Antonio hospital who lost both an arm and a leg during the United States invasion of Panama that year. Bush kept the flag prominently displayed as a reminder of the sacrifices soldiers make. When dignitaries from other countries visited the Oval Office, Bush asked that a small flag from their country be displayed in the pencil cup as well.

Bush was defeated by Bill Clinton in the 1992 United States presidential election. Before leaving office on Jan. 20, 1993 Bush wrote a note to Clinton and left it on his desk in the Oval Office. This note began a tradition where outgoing presidents leave private messages to incoming presidents on the Oval Office desk. Clinton moved the Resolute desk back into the Oval Office for his presidency. The C&O Desk remained as part of the White House collection after Bush left office, according to Jay Patton, the supervisory curator of the George H.W. Bush Presidential Library and Museum.

Timeline

The location of the desk from its construction to present day and each tenant of the desk is as follows:

Replicas

A replica of the C&O desk is located in the George Bush Presidential Library, in College Station, Texas, as a part of a full-scale replica of the Oval Office furnished as it was during Bush's presidency. This Oval Office replica was not original to the museum but was added approximately ten years after its creation. According to a 2021 interview with Warren Finch, director of the library, by Jeff Miller for Texas Co-op Power magazine, "President Bush noted that every other presidential library had an Oval Office display, and he thought they were boring. For the library’s first 10 years, the Oval Office display didn’t exist. But eventually President Bush was overruled, and the display is one of the most popular stops for visitors."

References

External links
 

1920 works
Chesapeake and Ohio Railway
Individual desks
Furnishings of the White House
Presidency of George H. W. Bush